Betty Ann Carr (1942-1995) was an American actress, musician, composer and film editor best remembered for her television work.

Early life
Carr was born to William Raymond and Helen Marie Brown as one-half Cherokee and one-half French and was the oldest of six children. She was raised on a small farm in Asbury, Missouri, outside Joplin, Missouri and according to the actress, grew up in a poor family, saying: "We were poor, but so was everybody else, so I didn't think about that.

Despite interests in music as a child, Carr studied Drama at the San Diego State University.

Her siblings are Perry, James, Susan, Benny, Kay Brown.

Career
Carr started her career by appearing as a dancer in Rowan & Martin's Laugh-In. Her first prominent role came in 1971, replacing actress Sandra Ego as Betty Ann Sundown in the western series Cade's County until 1972. Besides appearing in the series, she taught to Indian actors at Jay Silverheels's drama school in San Fernando Valley. On this work, she commented in a 1973 interview:

"Indians never were schooled in drama. If we want good actors we must begin by training the young; so I teach kids, 18 and under. For a while we had a busload of students from 12 to 16 coming in weekly from the Sherman Institute, but that stopped when the Institute ran out of money to pay the driver."

Carr, however, did not consider herself as an 'Indian actress' until casting directors rejected her at auditions because she looked "too ethnic" or "too dark" for non-Indian parts. Carr is probably best remembered for appearing as Monica Bell in the daytime soap opera Return to Peyton Place, for which she flew from San Diego to Los Angeles. Carr achieved some fame with the role, which she first played in May 1973, and was featured in several daytime-oriented magazines. She also composed songs for musicians by the time, and edited an Indian film.

Following the show's cancellation, Carr went on to guest star in several TV series and she was active as an actress until 1985.

Personal life
Carr was married to engineer Tom Carr.

References

External links

1947 births
American soap opera actresses
American television actresses
Living people
Actresses from Montana
Musicians from Montana
San Diego State University alumni
American people of Cherokee descent
People from Liberty County, Montana
People from Joplin, Missouri
21st-century American women